A Secret Institution, a 19th-century woman's lunatic asylum narrative, is the autobiography of Clarissa Caldwell Lathrop. Published in 1890 after she had regained her freedom, it details Lathrop's institutionalization at Utica Lunatic Asylum for voicing suspicions that someone was trying to poison her. Written novelistically, book reviews of the time suggested that it was poorly written and fell short of its object, while 21st-century reviewers praise the exposing of 19th-century mental institutions, which confined outspoken women.

A Secret Institution (New York: Bryant Publishing Co.) has the external appearance of a novel, but was intended as a statement of facts concerning the way things were managed in the Utica Lunatic Asylum. The author, Clarissa Caldwell Lathrop, said that in 1880, at the instance of her mother and sister, she was confined in that establishment and remained there for two years, although she was confident of her sanity during that entire period. She was finally brought out on a writ of habeas corpus applied for by James Bailey Silkman. She stated that, like herself, he had been incarcerated at Utica asylum under a false charge of lunacy, trumped up by relatives, and that on regaining his freedom, he published an announcement that he would "help any sane person out of an asylum who would communicate with him, giving his office address at New York City." After Lathrop found a way to notify Silkman, he applied for a writ, on which she was taken to Hudson River State Hospital at Poughkeepsie, where her sanity was established and she was freed by Judge George G. Barnard.

Criticism
The Catholic World book review of 1891 commented that: 

The Belford's Magazine book review of 1891 commented that,

References

Attribution

Bibliography

External links

A Secret Institution at Internet Archive

American autobiographies
1890 non-fiction books
Books about psychiatric hospitals